The O.L. Dunaway House is a historic house at 920 Center Street in Conway, Arkansas.  It is a two-story brick American Foursquare, with a hip roof and brick foundation.  A single-story porch extends across the front and around the side, supported by brick columns.  It is relatively broad for the style, its shape influenced by the Prairie School of design.  It was built in 1923 for Oscar Lee Dunaway, a Christadelphian Bible school teacher.

The house was listed on the National Register of Historic Places in 1996.

See also
National Register of Historic Places listings in Faulkner County, Arkansas

References

Houses on the National Register of Historic Places in Arkansas
Houses completed in 1923
Houses in Conway, Arkansas
National Register of Historic Places in Faulkner County, Arkansas
Individually listed contributing properties to historic districts on the National Register in Arkansas